Hunting Ground is a trade paperback collecting comic stories based on the Angel television series.

Story description

General  synopsis

A murderer is leaving corpses across L.A. sewers, and the evidence found by Detective Kate Lockley suggests Angel is responsible. Angel does not know which demon or monster is trying to set him up. In the other story Cordelia lands the main role in a Blair Witch type film about three filmmakers looking for the Helm of Haraxis. However the film is a sham and the Helm's the real thing. Angel tries to rescue Cordelia and the other filmmakers.

Beneath the Surface
Detective Kate Lockley is in the midst of searching for the person responsible for a series of killings. All have occurred in the underground accesses that Angel uses so often. Angel's investigation begins when Lockley herself starts to search the tunnels.

Hunting Ground
Comic title: Hunting Ground/Lovely, Dark, and Deep

Cordelia gets a role in a movie. Surprisingly, considering her ability, it is the starring role. She must play someone who is working with a team of treasure-hunters who are looking for the legendary Helm of Haraxis. Deep in the forest things suddenly start to go bad. A series of demons begin hunting themselves. Angel must do what he can to get there in time.

Continuity
The comic is supposed to be set in Angel season 1 after the episode Expecting.

Canonical issues

Angel comics such as this one are not usually considered by fans as canonical. Some fans consider them stories from the imaginations of authors and artists, while other fans consider them as taking place in an alternative fictional reality. However unlike fan fiction, overviews summarising their story, written early in the writing process, were 'approved' by both Fox and Joss Whedon (or his office), and the books were therefore later published as officially Buffy merchandise.

Angel (1999 TV series) comics